Grabovica is a settlement in the Kotor Varoš Municipality, Republika Srpska, Bosnia and Herzegovina. It is located by the Vrbanja river, the new village on the mouth on Grabovička rijeka, and old one at around 3 km upstream of this Vrbanja's tributary. Grabovica is situated at an altitude of about 450 m, and the distance from Kotor Varos is about 23 km.

It is believed that during the Bosnian War (1992–95) around 161 Bosniaks held captive at the Grabovica elementary school by the Army of the Republika Srpska were killed (their graves undiscovered).

Population

References

Villages in Republika Srpska
Populated places in Kotor Varoš